St George's is a covered shopping centre in Harrow, Greater London, which opened in 1996. It is located at St Anns Road in the town centre nearby but separate from the St Anns centre. As of 2015 the centre has 30 units for retail, leisure and restaurant uses across three floors, including TK Maxx, Boots, Nando's, Vue and Fitness First. St George's has an annual footfall of 8.9 million. It is anchored by TK Maxx and the 12-screen Vue cinema.

History

St George's was built on the site of a former furniture store called Adam's. The building of Adam's furnishers dates back to 1910 when the short-lived Harrow Empire and Picturedrome was at before closing in 1913.

The centre opened on St George's Day 1996 as St George's Shopping and Leisure Centre and launched with new stores for the town including a Virgin Megastore, Disney Store, and a McDonald's that still remains as one of two branches in the town centre. The centre also had a new 12 screen cinema under the Warner Village Cinemas which operates since 2004 as Vue.

It was once owned by Propinvest. In 2011 the centre was bought by Redefine International for £68 million.

References

Shopping centres in the London Borough of Harrow
Shopping malls established in 1996